Rudolf Seydel (May 27, 1835 – December 8, 1892) was a German philosopher and theologian born in Dresden.

In 1860 he received his habilitation at the University of Leipzig, where in 1867 he became an associate professor of philosophy. He was a disciple of Christian Hermann Weisse (1801-1866), and is remembered for his studies involving parallels between Buddhism and Christianity. Seydel died in Leipzig on December 8, 1892.

Selected writings 
 Schopenhauers philosophisches System (Schopenhauer's philosophical system), 1857. 
 Logik oder Wissenschaft vom Wissen (Logic or science of wisdom), 1866.
 Die Religion der Religionen (The religion of religions), 1872. 
 Ethik oder Wissenschaft vom Seinsollenden (Ethic or science of the Seinsollenden), 1874.
 Das Evangelium von Jesu in seinem Verhältnis zur Buddhasage und Buddhlehre (The Gospel of Jesus in relation to the Buddha legend and teachings), 1882. 
 Die Buddhalegende und das Leben Jesu nach den Evangelien (The Buddha legend and the life of Jesus after the Gospels), 1884.
 Buddha und Christus (Buddha and Christ), 1884. 
 Religion und Wissenschaft. Gesammelte Reden und Abhandlungen (Religion and science, Collection of Writings and Papers), 1887. 
 Religionsphilosophie im Umriß (Philosophy of religion in outline); (edited by Paul Wilhelm Schmiedel 1893).

References 
  translated biography @ Meyers Konversations-Lexikon
 A dictionary of Christ and the Gospels by James Hastings

German philosophers
Clergy from Dresden
Academic staff of Leipzig University
1835 births
1892 deaths
German male writers